Gararu is a municipality located in the Brazilian state of Sergipe.

The municipality was designated a priority area for conservation and sustainable use when the Caatinga Ecological Corridor was created in 2006.

References

Municipalities in Sergipe